AKM Fazlul Haque is a Bangladesh Nationalist Party politician and the former Member of Parliament of Mymensingh-4.

Career
Haque was elected to parliament from Mymensingh-4 as a Bangladesh Nationalist Party candidate in 1991.

References

Bangladesh Nationalist Party politicians
Living people
5th Jatiya Sangsad members
Year of birth missing (living people)